Von Haartman is a Swedish-origin surname. Persons with the surname include:

 Carl "Goggi" von Haartman (1897–1980), Finnish film-maker
 Carl Daniel von Haartman (1792–1877), Finnish physician
 Lars Gabriel von Haartman (1789-1859), Finnish politician
 Karl Robert Eduard von Hartmann (1842–1906), German philosopher
 Lars von Haartman (1919–1998), Finnish ornithologist